The Breeze was a network of Independent Local Radio stations broadcasting to Bristol, Hampshire, Isle of Wight, Somerset, North Dorset, North Gloucestershire, North Somerset, South Devon, South West Surrey, West Berkshire and West Wiltshire, as well as in East Anglia as Radio Norwich 99.9, The Beach, North Norfolk Radio, Town 102 and Dream 100. The stations broadcast a 'contemporary easy listening' format, playing classic and recent melodic popular music aimed principally at listeners over the age of 40.

The Breeze network operated on various FM frequencies and was also online at thebreeze.com., and other relevant links for the East Anglian stations. All frequencies branded The Breeze were previously separate stations centred on each of the broadcast areas, which had been acquired and combined into one network, carrying separate breakfast and drivetime programming for the south and the west of England, and a separate breakfast show hosted by Rob Chandler for East Anglia.

Following the purchase of owners Celador Radio in early 202 by Bauer Radio,  the network was closed on 1 September 2020 and replaced by Greatest Hits Radio.

History
The network launched when Play Radio (a combination of two stations in Hampshire) was acquired by Celador along with an additional station in Portsmouth and rebranded as The Breeze on 4 July 2010. The individual stations have all operated under various owners, formats and identities, with the stations having launched between 1998 and 1999 as a series of local stations focused on a specified broadcast area.

In 2011, Celador acquired two Total Star stations in Bristol & Bridgwater, and successfully applied for an FM licence serving the Bath area, and relaunched all stations as The Breeze.  All local programming is now identical across all licence areas.

The Breeze is currently based in Torbay, Southampton, Bristol and Basingstoke.

In February 2019, Bauer Radio acquired Celador Radio stations, including The Breeze. The licences for Southampton, Portsmouth and Winchester were sold on to Nation Broadcasting, along with Sam FM (South Coast) which also broadcasts from the Southampton studios, due to the overlap with existing Bauer-owned regional adult-contemporary service Wave 105. The other Breeze stations will remain with Bauer.

As of July 13, 2020, The Breeze network closed, ahead of Bauer's decision to relaunch the stations as part of its Greatest Hits Radio network. They retained their branding but shared the same playlist as Greatest Hits Radio until GHR was fully launched on the former Breeze stations on September 1.

Stations
These stations comprised The Breeze network.

 The Breeze (Basingstoke & North Hampshire) The station was launched on 16 December 2012 by the merging of three stations in Andover, Newbury and Basingstoke.  In August 2017 107 JACK FM (Berkshire) in Reading was rebranded as 'The Breeze', and added to the Thames Valley feed.
 The Breeze (Bridgwater & West Somerset) launched in 1998 as Quaywest 102.4. It later acquired a station called BCRfm before being taken over by One Gold Radio and relaunched as Total Star Somerset until August 2011.
 The Breeze (East Hampshire & South West Surrey) was originally three individual stations all launched in 1999 – SouthCity FM (Southampton), Win 107.2 (Winchester) and Radio Victory (Portsmouth). Following subsequent mergers and acquisitions the stations were acquired by Celador in 2010 and rebranded into one station. Kestrel FM Haslemere joined the south network on 16 December 2012.
 The Breeze (North Dorset) started on 25 June 1995 as 97.4 Gold Radio before becoming Vale FM. It was rebranded as Midwest Radio in August 2010.
 The Breeze (North Somerset) started on 23 October 1999 as 107.7 WFM before later becoming Star 107.7 and then Nova Radio in September 2010.
 The Breeze (South Devon) started on 26 May 2006 as Palm 105.5, which had previously held three Restricted Service Licences for the Torbay area.
 The Breeze (South West) was created on 29 March 2013 by the merging of four stations in Bristol, Bath, North Somerset, Frome & West Wiltshire
 The Breeze (Yeovil & South Somerset) started in October 2003 as Ivel FM and relaunched as Midwest Radio in August 2010.

These stations joined the network in January 2017, but did not rebrand. These stations are all in East Anglia.

Radio Norwich 99.9 
The Beach
North Norfolk Radio
Town 102
Dream 100

References

External links
 Official website

Southampton
Mass media in Bath, Somerset
Winchester
Former British radio networks